The southern bentbill (Oncostoma olivaceum) is a species of bird in the family Tyrannidae. It is found in Colombia and Panama. Its natural habitats are subtropical or tropical moist lowland forests and heavily degraded former forest.

References

southern bentbill
Birds of Panama
Birds of Colombia
southern bentbill
Taxonomy articles created by Polbot